Platyptilia davisi is a moth of the family Pterophoridae. It is known from Chile.

The wingspan is about 22 mm. Adults are on wing in January.

External links

davisi
Endemic fauna of Chile
Moths of South America
Moths described in 1991
Taxa named by Cees Gielis